Ashmont can mean:

 Ashmont, Alberta a hamlet in Canada
 Ashmont, Massachusetts, a section of the Dorchester neighborhood of Boston, Massachusetts
 Ashmont (MBTA station), an MBTA subway station in Dorchester, Boston
 Ashmont, New South Wales, a suburb of Wagga Wagga in Australia